Nealcidion eulophum is a species of beetle in the family Cerambycidae. It was described by Bates in 1881. It has been found in Mexico, Honduras, Guatemala, Belize and Costa Rica.

References

Nealcidion
Beetles described in 1881